The CPBL All-Star Game, alternatively known as Red v. White All-Star Game, is an annual baseball game held by the Chinese Professional Baseball League of Taiwan. The teams are organized along the geographic dispositions of the member organizations; the red team is made up of players from Lamigo Monkeys of Taoyuan and EDA Rhinos of Kaohsiung, while the white team consists of players from Brother Elephants of Taipei and Uni-President 7-Eleven Lions of Tainan.

Between 1990 and 1992, the locations of the All-Star Game were fixed at Taipei, Taichung, and Kaohsiung, with one game at each location annually. The regulation was amended and currently there is only one game each year with location varies from year to year. There is also a Home Run Derby the day before the All-Star Game.

Star Game in 2013 to increase the fun, then changed to a hybrid (first defensive position by voting, that "special pick-Star Game Club" by the head coach of both teams draft) fans voted with the largest number of votes each defensive position before the two name (outfielder top six) as the starting teams, head coach of the rest of the players adopt the recommended way to join the race list.

In addition, the performance of the tournament, this decade, as long as the race team with Bulls, they will not win, which is also known as the "curse of agriculture."(興農魔咒)

Results

See also
 Chinese Professional Baseball League
 CPBL Home Run Derby
 Taiwan Series
Baseball awards#Taiwan (Republic of China)

Chinese Professional Baseball League competitions
Recurring sporting events established in 1990